Jimmy O. Yang (born June 11, 1987) is a Hongkongese American actor, stand-up comedian, and writer. As an actor, he is best known for starring as Jian-Yang in the HBO comedy series Silicon Valley, as Dr. Chan Kaifang in the Netflix comedy series Space Force, and as Josh Lin in the Netflix romantic comedy film Love Hard (2021).

Early life and education
Yang was born  in Hong Kong during British rule. His parents were both from Shanghai and later moved to Hong Kong. In 2000, when Yang was 13, his family emigrated to the United States and settled in Los Angeles, California. His aunt and grandmother were already living in the US; his parents joined them primarily to allow Yang and his brother, Roy, access to better schools. Yang enrolled at John Burroughs Middle School for eighth grade, then later attended Beverly Hills High School.

Yang graduated from the University of California, San Diego with a degree in economics in 2009. The commencement speaker at his college graduation was his future Silicon Valley showrunner and fellow UCSD alumnus Mike Judge.

Career
Yang did his first stand-up set at 21 years old as "Lowball Jim" at the Ha Ha Comedy Club in North Hollywood, Los Angeles.

After graduation, he interned at the financial consulting firm Smith Barney in Beverly Hills, California, but found it unfulfilling and turned down its return offer. Instead, he returned to San Diego to finish his graduation requirements. He stayed in the city afterward, where he sold used cars, DJed at a strip club, and seated customers at a comedy club to support himself while doing stand-up sets for free at The Comedy Palace. There he met his mentor, Sean Kelly, a stand-up comedian who ran the venue and later created the reality show Storage Hunters.

When Yang moved back to Los Angeles, he signed up with Central Casting, due to their low barrier of entry, and with various casting websites. He was spurred to consider acting when a friend told him there was money to be made in residual checks from commercials. In the interim, he did stand-up sets around Southern California and signed up for acting classes. He eventually found acting representation through the Vesta Talent Agency.

Yang made his television debut on the CBS series 2 Broke Girls in 2012, and his first late-night stand-up appearance on The Arsenio Hall Show in 2014. He played Tang-See in season 9 of It's Always Sunny in Philadelphia, and appeared in an episode of Criminal Minds as Nathan Chow, a high-school student who suffered a psychotic break. He was a writer/consultant for the Harlem Globetrotters, and voiced roles in the video game Infamous Second Son.

He initially appeared on Silicon Valley in a guest role, making scale, then $900 per episode. He appeared in three episodes and spent the money on a Prius so he could drive for Uber to earn money between the show's first and second seasons. For season 2, he was promoted to series regular. Prior to the announcement, he had landed a series-regular role on the Yahoo! Screen original television show Sin City Saints. He turned down the offer because it would have required him to quit Silicon Valley, which ran from 2014 to 2019.

Yang's first dramatic role was as Dun "Danny" Meng, a Chinese immigrant who is carjacked by the Tsarnaev brothers, in the 2016 action drama Patriots Day.

In 2018, he played Bernard Tai in the romantic comedy film Crazy Rich Asians, directed by Jon M. Chu.

On September 26, 2019, it was announced that Yang was cast as Dr. Chan Kaifang in the Netflix comedy series Space Force.

In 2020, he starred opposite Ryan Hansen in two films, Like a Boss and Fantasy Island, released a month apart. In the first film, their characters were business partners; and in the second, they were step-siblings who were strongly fond of each other.

Yang's comedy special Good Deal was released on Amazon Prime Video on May 8, 2020. He stars opposite Nina Dobrev in Netflix's Love Hard, his first romantic film.

How to American

Yang is also the author of How to American: An Immigrant's Guide to Disappointing Your Parents, a book where "he shares his story of growing up as a Chinese immigrant who pursued a Hollywood career against the wishes of his parents." Mike Judge wrote the foreword.

Yang has also continued doing stand-up comedy; in 2018, he appeared on a tour titled after the book.

Personal life
Along with English, Yang speaks Shanghainese, Cantonese and Mandarin Chinese.

Yang's father, Richard Ouyang, later signed with the same talent agency and has appeared in several films, including playing his son's character's father in Patriots Day.

Yang became an American citizen in 2015. He has a YouTube channel with a focus on cooking.

Filmography

Television

Film

Video games

References

External links

 
 
 Jimmy O. Yang at Instagram

Living people
American stand-up comedians
American people of Hong Kong descent
American people of Chinese descent
1987 births
University of California, San Diego alumni
21st-century American comedians
American comedians of Asian descent
Hong Kong stand-up comedians
Hong Kong emigrants to the United States